Rudolf 'Rudi' Flögel (born 13 December 1939) is an Austrian former professional footballer who played as a striker for Rapid Vienna.

He is the father of Thomas Flögel.

Club career
Born in Vienna, Rudi Flögel played almost his entire career at Rapid Wien, where he captained the team in his last two seasons before moving to Admira Wiener Neustadt and Simmering.

International career
He made his debut for Austria in a May 1960 friendly match against Scotland. He earned 40 caps, scoring 6 goals.

His last international was a September 1969 friendly match against West Germany.

Honours
 Austrian Football Bundesliga (4): 1960, 1964, 1967, 1968
 Austrian Cup (4): 1961, 1968, 1969, 1972

External links
 Player stats – Rapid Archiv

References

1939 births
Living people
Footballers from Vienna
Association football forwards
Austrian footballers
Austria international footballers
SK Rapid Wien players
Austrian Football Bundesliga players
Austrian football managers
1. Simmeringer SC managers
Wiener Sport-Club managers
1. Wiener Neustädter SC players
1. Simmeringer SC players